Mary, Countess of Blois, also known as Marie of Avesnes, (1200–1241) was countess of Blois from 1230 to 1241.

She was the daughter of Walter of Avesnes and Margaret of Blois.

In 1226, Mary married Hugh I of Châtillon, a count from Châtillon-sur-Marne, son of Gaucher III of Châtillon and Elisabeth of Saint-Pol. They had five children:
 John I (died 1280), Count of Blois
 Guy II (died 1289), Count of Saint Pol
 Gaucher (died 1261), lord of Crécy and Crèvecœur
 Hugh (died 1255)
 Basile (died 1280), became Abbess of Notre Dame du Val in 1248.

Her eldest son, John, succeeded her in Blois.

References

External links
 Counts of Blois

1200 births
1241 deaths
Marie
13th-century French nobility
13th-century French women
13th-century women rulers